Frank Todd ( – 	4 January 1959) was an English professional rugby league footballer who played in the 1910s and 1920s.

Background
Frank Todd was born in Halifax, West Riding of Yorkshire, England.

Playing career

International honours
Frank Todd won caps for England while at Halifax in 1921 against Australia, in 1923 against Wales, and in 1924 against Other Nationalities.

County honours
Frank Todd won caps for Yorkshire while at Halifax.

Challenge Cup Final appearances
Frank Todd played , i.e. number 5, in Halifax's 0-13 defeat by Leigh in the 1920–21 Challenge Cup Final during the 1920–21 season at The Cliff, Broughton on Saturday 30 April 1921, in front of a crowd of 25,000.

Club career
Frank Todd made his début for Halifax during 1916, and he played his last match for Halifax on Saturday 21 April 1928.

Honoured at Halifax RLFC
Todd was inducted into the Halifax RLFC Hall Of Fame in 2008.

References

External links

1890s births
1959 deaths
England national rugby league team players
English rugby league players
Halifax R.L.F.C. players
Place of death missing
Rugby league five-eighths
Rugby league wingers
Rugby league players from Halifax, West Yorkshire
Yorkshire rugby league team players